Gunhild (with variants Gundhild, Gunhilda, Gunhilde, Gunhjild, Gunilda, Gunnhild, Gunnhildr, Gunnhildur) is a Germanic feminine given name composed of two words meaning "war" (gunn and hild/hildr). It may refer to:

, allegedly a Danish queen consort, wife of Harald Bluetooth
Gunhild of Wenden, wife of Sweyn I of Denmark
 Gunhilde (died 1002), said to have been the sister of Sweyn Forkbeard
Gunhild of Wessex, (1055–1097), eldest daughter of Harold Godwinson and Edith the Fair
Gunhild Carling, Swedish jazz musician
Gunhild Kyle (1921–2016), Swedish historian
Gunhild Rosén (1855–1928), Swedish ballerina
891 Gunhild, an asteroid in the Asteroid Belt
Gunhilda of Denmark, daughter of Canute the Great and wife of Henry III, Holy Roman Emperor
Gunhilde, sister of Sweyn I of Denmark, wife of Pallig Tokesen
Domina Gunilda, a weapon of remarkable size at Windsor Castle in the 1300s; considered the origin of the word "gun"
Gunnhild, Mother of Kings, wife of Erik Bloodaxe
Gunnhildr Sveinsdóttir, queen consort of Denmark and Sweden

In the masculine form, Gunnhildus, it is attested from earlier times.
Gunnhildus, Visigothic bishop of Maguelonne.

See also
gunhild, a French clothing brand
 The name of the London area "Gunnersbury" means "Manor house of a woman called Gunnhildr", and is from an old Scandinavian personal name + Middle English -bury, manor or manor house.
Gunilda, a steel yacht which sank on Lake Superior.

References

External links
Nomina • Historiska Museet
Gunilda - Nordic Names

Given names
Feminine given names